Ymer Dishnica (21 February 1912 – 22 September 1998) was an Albanian politician and physician.  He served as Minister of Health from 1944 to 1946 and as Chairman of the Constituent Assembly from 1946 to 1947.

Ymer Dishnica was born in 1912 in Dishnicë village, 4 km away from Korçë. He took his elementary studies in Korçë, and after attended the Albanian National Lyceum which he finished in 1932. In 1932–1941 he studied medicine in France, respectively in the University of Lyon and after that the University of Paris.

Dishnica was active during World War II, by joining the National Liberation Movement forces. He was the head of the NLM delegation in the Conference of Mukje, negotiating an unified front with Balli Kombëtar, for which he would be criticized by Enver Hoxha. He was later expelled from the Party of Labour of Albania and served as a doctor in a hospital in Tirana.

References

Further reading
Islami, Myslim: Doktor Ymer Dishnica: 1912-1998, .

1912 births
1998 deaths
People from Korçë
Albanian communists
Speakers of the Parliament of Albania
Members of the Parliament of Albania
20th-century Albanian physicians
Albanian resistance members
Albanian National Lyceum alumni
Government ministers of Albania
Health ministers of Albania